Kuttari Dam  is a rockfill dam located in Hokkaido Prefecture in Japan. The dam is used for irrigation and power production. The catchment area of the dam is 940 km2. The dam impounds about 49  ha of land when full and can store 3130 thousand cubic meters of water. The construction of the dam was started on 1983 and completed in 1988.

References

Dams in Hokkaido